Butades of Sicyon ( Boutades), sometimes mistakenly called Dibutades, was the reputed inventor of the art of modelling clay in relief, which an accident first led him to practise, in conjunction with his daughter, at Corinth. The period at which he flourished is unknown, but has been put at about 600 BC. 

The story, as recorded by Pliny the Elder, is that his daughter, Kora of Sicyon, smitten with love for a youth at Corinth where they lived, drew upon the wall the outline of his shadow, and that upon this outline her father modelled a face of the youth in clay, which he baked along with the clay tiles which it was his trade to make. This model was preserved in the Nymphaeum in Corinth until Lucius Mummius sacked that city in 146 BC. This incident led Butades to ornament the ends or edges of gutter roof tiles with masks of human faces, at first in low relief (protypa) and afterwards in high relief (ectypa), a practice which is attested by numerous existing examples. Pliny adds that Butades invented the colouring of plastic works by adding a red colour to them (from the existing works of this kind it seems to have been red sand, or modelling them in red chalk). He is also said to have invented a mixture of clay and ruddle (red ochre), or to have introduced the use of a special kind of red clay. Pliny adds Hine et fastigia templorum orta, that is, the terra-cotta figures which Butades was said to have invented, were used to ornament the pediments of temples.

References

Sources
"Dibutades". In William Smith (ed.). Dictionary of Greek and Roman Biography and Mythology. 1. Boston: Little, Brown & Co., 1867.

7th-century BC Greek sculptors
Ancient Greek sculptors
Ancient Sicyonians